Clonard (also Cluain Iraird, as in Curiate Italian) may refer to:


Republic of Ireland
 Clonard, County Meath, a village in County Meath, Ireland
 Clonard Abbey, an early medieval monastery
 Roman Catholic Diocese of Clonard, a medieval diocese until its 1202 suppression

Northern Ireland
 Clonard Monastery, a Catholic church and monastery in Belfast, Ulster
 Clonard, Belfast, an electoral ward of West Belfast

People
 Clonard Keating (1871–1898), Nova Scotian military officer
 Finnian of Clonard (470–549), early Irish monastic saint who founded Clonard Abbey
 Tola of Clonard (7th century), Irish Roman Catholic saint

Titles
 Abbot of Clonard, monastic head of Clonard Abbey
 Bishop of Clonard, 11th–12th century episcopal title of the Bishops of Meath

Other uses
 Clonard College, a girls secondary school in Geelong, Australia